Kazimierz Piotr Schally (English: Casimir Peter Schally; 22 February 1895, Nowy Sącz, Galicia – 12 January 1967, Edinburgh, Scotland) was a Polish army general. He served as Chief of the Cabinet of President Ignacy Mościcki.

His son is the Polish-American endocrinologist Andrew Schally.

Military awards 
 Virtuti Militari
 Order of Polonia Restituta
 Cross of Independence
 Cross of Valor (four times)
 Cross of Merit (twice)
 Legion of Honour (France)

References

1895 births
1967 deaths
People from Nowy Sącz
People from the Kingdom of Galicia and Lodomeria
Polish generals
Polish Military Organisation members
Lviv Polytechnic alumni
Polish legionnaires (World War I)
Blue Army (Poland) personnel
Polish people of the Polish–Soviet War
Polish military personnel of World War II
Polish emigrants to the United Kingdom
Recipients of the Silver Cross of the Virtuti Militari
Commanders of the Order of Polonia Restituta
Recipients of the Cross of Independence with Swords
Recipients of the Cross of Valour (Poland)
Recipients of the Gold Cross of Merit (Poland)
Officiers of the Légion d'honneur
Polish people of German descent